A by-election to the Jamaican House of Representatives was held for the Clarendon South Eastern constituency on March 2, 2020. The seat was declared vacant due to the resignation of member of Parliament Rudyard Spencer on February 4, 2020. The election was won by Pearnel Charles Jr. of the Jamaica Labour Party.

Background
The PNP did not contest the by-election.

Dates

Result

See also
 Politics of Jamaica
 Elections in Jamaica

References

2020 in Jamaica
By-elections in Jamaica